Magarajen Monien (born ) is a Mauritian male weightlifter, competing in the 69 kg category and representing Mauritius at international competitions. He participated at the 2010 Commonwealth Games in the 69 kg event.

Major competitions

References

Further reading
 OlyStats.com
 BBC Sport Weightlifting: Men's 69kg
 British Weightlifting.org 
 Oceania Weightlifting.com 

1981 births
Living people
Mauritian male weightlifters
Weightlifters at the 2010 Commonwealth Games
Commonwealth Games competitors for Mauritius
Place of birth missing (living people)